Zied Azizi (born 11 June 1991) is a Tunisian athlete specialising in the 400 metres hurdles. He won a bronze medal at the 2018 Mediterranean Games.

His personal best in the event is 49.13 seconds set in Tarragona in 2018. This is the current national record.

International competitions

Personal bests
Outdoor
200 metres – 21.62 (+0.7 m/s, Radés 2012)
400 metres – 47.29 (Reims 2016)
400 metres hurdles – 49.13 (Tarragona 2018)

Indoor
200 metres – 22.10 (Val-de-Reuil 2013)
400 metres – 48.34 (Belgrade 2017)

References

1991 births
Living people
Tunisian male hurdlers
Mediterranean Games bronze medalists for Tunisia
Mediterranean Games medalists in athletics
Athletes (track and field) at the 2018 Mediterranean Games
21st-century Tunisian people
20th-century Tunisian people